The Order of Distinction is a national order in the Jamaican honours system. It is the sixth in order of precedence of the Orders of Societies of Honour, which were instituted by an Act of Parliament (The National Honours and Awards Act) in 1968. The motto of the Order is "Distinction Through Service".

The Order of Distinction is conferred upon citizens of Jamaica who have rendered outstanding and important services to Jamaica, or to distinguished citizens of a country other than Jamaica. The former are made Members of the Order, and the latter are made Honorary Members.

The Order has two ranks: the higher class of Commander, and the lower class of Officer. Commanders take place and precedence immediately after Members and Honorary Members of the Order of Jamaica. A Member or Honorary Member may be promoted from the rank of Officer to that of Commander.

Commanders of the Order of Distinction are entitled to use the post-nominal letters CD in the case of Members, or CD (Hon.) in the case of Honorary Members. Officers of the Order of Distinction are entitled to use the post-nominal letters OD in the case of Members, or OD (Hon.) in the case of Honorary Members.

Officers

Art
 Carl Abrahams
 Gloria Escoffery
 Christopher González

Theatre
Patrick Brown

Education
 Heather Little-White

Journalism
 Charles Kinkead

Law
 Lloyd Stanbury

Music
 Ernest Ranglin
 Prince Buster
 Alton Ellis
 Ken Boothe
 Jah Jerry Haynes
 Carl Brady
 Lloyd Brevett
 Lennie Hibbert
 Olive Lewin
 Burning Spear
 Roland Alphonso
 Lee "Scratch" Perry
 Phil Chen
 Gregory Isaacs
 Derrick Morgan
 Rexton Gordon "Shabba Ranks"
 Steven Woodham
 Sean Paul
 Rita Marley
 Chris Chin
 Yellowman
 Mighty Diamonds

Politics
 St. William Grant
 Gladstone Mills
 Arthur Henry Winnington Williams

Social work
 Hazel Monteith
 Noel Earl Alexander

Sport
 Jimmy Adams
 Gerry Alexander
 Simone Edwards
 Shelly-Ann Fraser-Pryce
 Chris Gayle
 George Headley
 Merlene Ottey
 Stafanie Taylor
 Theodore Whitmore
 Arthur Wint
 Elaine Thompson-Herah

Commanders

Art
Gene Pearson
Trevor Rhone

Journalism 
 Ian Boyne

Broadcasting 
 Newton James

Communication, media, education and culture
 Fae Ellington
Daphne Elaine Innerarity
 Cynthia Reyes
 Madge Sinclair

Economics 

George Beckford

Law 
Shirley Miller
Paula Llewellyn

Medical
Gwendolyn Spencer

Music
 Coxsone Dodd
 Millie Small
 Bob Andy
 Sonny Bradshaw
 Dennis Brown
 Tommy Cowan
 Marcia Griffiths
 John Holt
 Byron Lee
 Lee "Scratch" Perry
 Duke Reid
 Shaggy
 Lloyd Hall
 Delroy Wilson
 Monty Alexander
 Barry Moncrieffe
 Phyllis Dillon

Politics
 Patrick Allen
 Neville Eden Gallimore
 Douglas Saunders
 Ransford Smith
 Clifford Everald Warmington
 Audley Shaw
 Fenton Ferguson

Sport
 Alia Atkinson
 Usain Bolt
 Veronica Campbell-Brown
 Shelly-Ann Fraser-Pryce
 Deon Hemmings-McCatty
 Shericka Jackson
 Asafa Powell
 Donald Quarrie
 Molly Rhone
 Khadija Shaw
 Elaine Thompson-Herah

References

External links
National Awards of Jamaica
Order of Distinction Office of the Prime Minister.
Jamaican Dental Association

 
Distinction, Order of